First National Bank of Lacona is a historic bank building located at Lacona in Oswego County, New York.  It was built in 1922-1923 and is a one-story, brick commercial structure in the Neoclassical style.  It is three bays wide and five bays long with a multi-stage parapet roof.

It was listed on the National Register of Historic Places in 1988. Today, the bank building is a PathFinder Bank branch.

References

Bank buildings on the National Register of Historic Places in New York (state)
Neoclassical architecture in New York (state)
Commercial buildings completed in 1923
Buildings and structures in Oswego County, New York
National Register of Historic Places in Oswego County, New York